Setesvein or setesvenn is the name of medieval and pre-reformatory armed pages who acted as local representatives of a bishop or of a feudal lord in Norway. Setesveins between 1350 and 1537 are commonly associated with the Catholic Archbishop, on whose behalf they exercised administrative and military functions in their respective districts. Clerical setesveins were especially numerous in Northern Norway, where they constitute an important part of the regional upper class history.

Etymology and definition 
The word setesvein consists of sete, meaning 'seat, residence', and svein, meaning 'young servant' or 'page'. It descends from Old Norwegian setusveinn. Under Danish influence, the word was spelled sædesvend, from which the modern, but today less used form setesvenn derives. Whilst svein is considered as Norwegian Nynorsk and svenn is mainly used in Norwegian Bokmål (including Riksmål), the form setesvein is predominant in both languages.

In general, a svein or a huskarl (housecarl) was a page residing at a court, whilst a setesvein was attached to a court, but had his own residence; thus the word sete. Johan Fritzner's dictionary of Old Norwegian defines a setusveinn as a housecarl who is in the service of a lendman or of a bishop without living at his master's residence or court.

Among other places, setesveins are mentioned in several Diplomatarium Norvegicum documents and in the Codex of the Hird. Examples are:

 RB 7119: þeir sem Noregs konungar hafa áðr leitt í sínum lögum nökkura setusveina at hafa
 DN III, 477 (35812): engin várra skal fleiri húskarla ok setusveina hafa en sem lögbók ok hirðskrá vátta
 DN VIII, 592 (58323)
 DN IX, 69413: alle the knaber therinde och sædescwenne

History

Until 1350 
A svein was originally an armed page who was in the service of and resided at the court of a chieftain. Subsequently, they separated into a secular and a clerical section. In the High Medieval Age (1130–1350) and in the Late Medieval Age (1350–1537), a page was normally one who had entered the court of a bishop or of a feudal lord. It was customary that young men of lower nobility and of local and wealthy families served at the court of the Archbishop (as a svein) until returning to his district, where he acted as his lord's representative (as a setesvein).

In Celestine III's papal bull of 15 June 1194, secular officers of the Archbishop received freedom from all taxes and military duties. According to the Sættargjerd of 1277 (a concordat between the Church and the King), which was approved by Pope Gregory X, the Archbishop had the right to have 100 setesveins, and this without paying taxes. Likewise, each bishop could have 40 setesveins.

In the years of the Black Death (c. 1348–1353), setesveins in the service of secular noblemen (knights) were placed under the direct control of the King. This represented the end of group of secular setesveins.

1350–1537 
In the Late Middle Ages, clerical setesveins were seated mainly along the coast, from Sogn in Western Norway to Finnmark in Northern Norway. Their function was to administer the Archbishop's estate, for example by collecting taxes. In addition, they traded, partly themselves and partly on behalf of the Archbishop. In the 1530s, there were at least 69 setesveins in Norway, whereof 49 in Northern Norway. The reason for their numerous presence in this region were the important fisheries and the thereto belonging export to Continental Europe.

Whilst they were not noble ex officio, setesveins had, in general, the same social and economical position as lower nobility. It is known that a few setesveins received 'noble freedom' from the Archbishop. Clerical setesveins were recruited mainly among lower nobility and very wealthy farmers.

Alike the nobility, setesveins enjoyed full tax freedom for their seat farms. They had freedom from leidang (military service); however, the Archbishop could order them into military service for the Archdiocese.

After the Reformation in 1537, when the Archbishop went into exile and the Catholic Church of Norway was dissolved and replaced by the Church of Norway, setesveins lost the legal foundation on which their positions rested. Furthermore, King Christian III did send soldiers to raid the coast, punishing and confiscating goods of setesveins who had supported the Archbishop.

After 1537 
In the following years, most setesveins continued being traders and shippers. Some of them apparently remained local representatives of the Church, now under the new, Lutheran Superintendent and the canons in Nidaros. Members of this class of ex-setesveins were known as pages (lit. 'boy') and are today known under the non-official term page nobility. They were part of the upper social class in Northern Norway in the 16th and 17th centuries, and several Nordland families descend from them. Their social significance and their impact on culture have been considerable in the region.

Information and statistics 
In a list of 1533, named Sancte Oluffz domkirkis Szeteswenne (Setesveins of the Cathedral of St. Olaf), one finds that Olav Engelbrektsson, Archbishop of Nidaros had 69 setesveins. Ending with 'etc.', the list is apparently incomplete.

1533 list: Statistics

1533 list: Names and places 
The following list is based mainly on Ludvig Ludvigsen Daae's presentation of the 1533 list of setesveins. The presentation is a part of an article named Den Throndhjemske Erkestols Sædesvende og Frimænd (1890). Daae's presentation contains additional comments and references. These are not included in the list below.

References

Literature 
 
 Daae, Ludvig Ludvigsen: Den Throndhjemske Erkestols Sædesvende og Frimænd, pp. 1–27 in the Historisk Tidsskrift, vol, III, series 1. Kristiania, 1890.
 Hamre, Lars: Setesvein, pp. 161–164 in Kulturhistorisk leksikon for nordisk middelalder, vol. 15. Copenhagen, 1970.
 
 

Norwegian nobility
History of Finnmark
History of Nordland
History of Troms